A Coy Decoy is a 1941 Warner Bros. Looney Tunes cartoon, directed by Bob Clampett. The cartoon was released on June 7, 1941, and stars Porky Pig and Daffy Duck.

The film is set in a closed book store at night, when the many characters and elements featured within the books come to life, similar to Frank Tashlin's own shorts Speaking of the Weather, Have You Got Any Castles?, and You're an Education. The idea would later be reworked five years later into Book Revue, although only Daffy features in that.

Plot
The film begins with Ludwig van Beethoven's "Moonlight Sonata" playing as the scene descends on a book store. The camera pans across an array of the bestselling books of early 1941 (including Valtin's Out of the Night, Fedorova's The Family, and Nordhoff and Hall's No More Gas), before reaching an older favorite, Uncle Tom's Cabin, which as a gag has a Federal Housing Administration sign in front of the cabin.

Porky Pig, featured on the cover of The Westerner, comes to life and sings "Ride, Tenderfoot, Ride." Across the way, Daffy Duck, featured on the cover of The Ugly Duckling, comes to life and sings "Git Along, Little Dogies." Daffy finds his way to Black Beauty and comes out riding not a horse, but a big black woman, whom he rides to The Lake.

A wolf emerges from The Wolf of Wall Street (presumably Blake McVeigh's novelization of the 1929 movie), sneaks behind Zane Grey's The Green Bay Tree and lures Daffy to him using a female duck decoy from the book Toys. Daffy is entranced and exclaims (quoting a recent hit record), "Well, Beat Me Daddy, Eight to the Bar." He follows and woos the decoy, adopting a Maurice Chevalier accent at one point, but when he closes his eyes the wolf enters and Daffy mistakenly embraces the wolf's nose. Once he realizes he is in danger, Daffy (recycling some of the dialogue from 1939's Hare-um Scare-um) tells the wolf that he is not worth eating (he claims to have so many diseases that even the draft rejected him) and runs away.

Daffy runs toward Ethel Vance's novel Escape but the wolf blocks his way.  As the wolf pursues, Daffy turns on him and exclaims the catchphrase form number one radio program Fibber McGee and Molly "You're a hard man, McGee."  He then uses the books to defeat the wolf. He opens a copy of Nordhoff and Hall's The Hurricane to blow the wolf away, and lightning from the book Lightning strikes the wolf. The wolf surrenders, fittingly under Ernest Hemingway's recent bestseller For Whom the Bell Tolls.

Daffy returns to the decoy. Porky enters the scene addresses in derision of Daffy, saying that Daffy and the decoy could never "mean anything to each other." Daffy sticks up his nose and swims away with the decoy, followed by four tiny decoys that look like Daffy.

Home media
This cartoon is available on many public domain video and DVD compilations (including Cartoon Explosion, Volume 2 released in 2001 by Front Row Entertainment where it is presented in its 1968 redrawn colorized form). The original black and white print fully remastered and uncut was included on the Porky Pig 101 DVD on September 19, 2017, that was officially released by Warner Archive.

References

External links
 
 A Coy Decoy Soundtrack | Ringostrack.com

Looney Tunes shorts
American comedy short films
1941 animated films
1941 short films
Films directed by Bob Clampett
1941 comedy films
Daffy Duck films
Porky Pig films
American black-and-white films
1940s Warner Bros. animated short films
1940s English-language films
American animated short films
Films about pigs
Films about ducks
Animated films about birds
Animated films about wolves
Films set in bookstores